Louis de Bourbon, called the Good (4 February 1337 – 10 August 1410), son of Peter de Bourbon and Isabella de Valois (the sister of French King Philip VI), was the third Duke of Bourbon.

Louis inherited the duchy after his father Duke Peter I died at the Battle of Poitiers in 1356.

On 19 August 1371 Louis married Anne of Auvergne (1358–1417), Countess of Forez and daughter of Beraud II, Dauphin of Auvergne, and his wife the Countess of Forez. They had:

 Catherine of Bourbon (b. 1378), d. young
 John of Bourbon (1381–1434), Duke of Bourbon
 Louis of Bourbon (1388 – 1404), Sieur de Beaujeu
 Isabelle of Bourbon (1384 – aft. 1451)

In 1390, Louis launched the Barbary Crusade against the Hafsids of Tunis, in conjunction with the Genoese. Its objective was to suppress piracy based in the city of Mahdia, but the siege was unsuccessful. Louis died at Montluçon in 1410, at the age of 73.

References

Sources

|-

1337 births
1410 deaths
Dukes of Bourbon
Counts of Forez
Counts of Clermont-en-Beauvaisis
Christians of the Barbary Crusade
Christians of the Battle of Nicopolis
House of Bourbon (France)
Burials at Souvigny Priory
14th-century peers of France
15th-century peers of France